Puerto Alegría is a town and municipality in the Colombian Department of Amazonas. Puerto Alegria was founded by Orlando Benjumea and Reinaldo Martínez, and officially recognized by the Colombian government as a municipality on January 1, 1981. The area contributes to Colombia's agricultural industry with its cultivation of yucca, corn, plantains, fruits, and avocado farms; it also produces livestock such as laying hens, cows, and pigs. The town of Puerto Alegria has a population of 1,531 people, and has a population density of just 0.2/ km2 . Ingrid Camacho Nini Stella is the town's mayor.

Climate
Puerto Alegría has a tropical rainforest climate (Köppen Af) with heavy to very heavy rainfall year-round.

References

Municipalities of Amazonas Department